The Ruger Hawkeye is a single-shot pistol chambered for the .256 Winchester Magnum cartridge, produced by Sturm, Ruger & Co. from 1963 until July 1964.  It was built on the same frame as the Ruger Blackhawk, but rather than having a rotating cylinder like a standard revolver, it featured a swiveling breechblock which allowed an individual round to be loaded and sealed into the frame.

The Ruger Hawkeye pistol was not a commercial success, and was discontinued after only 3,075 were produced.

References

External links
Serial number history
Instruction manual

Sources
Larry Kelly, J. D. Jones.  Hunting for Handgunners.  Book Sales, 1990.  .

Single-shot pistols
Sturm, Ruger & Company
Weapons and ammunition introduced in 1963